Baroun is a small area in the Farrukhabad city of Uttar Pradesh, India. It has a current population of 6,006.

References

World-gazetteer, Baroun

Cities and towns in Farrukhabad district